Hardik Satishchandra Shah  is an Indian civil servant as a member of Indian Administrative Service of Gujarat Cadre and is currently serving as the Private Secretary to the Prime Minister of India, Narendra Modi. He previously served as a Deputy Secretary in the Prime Minister's Office (India) (PMO) from August 2019. He is a 2010-batch IAS officer.

Education and early life 
Shah holds degrees in BTech, MTech and law. He received his bachelor's degree in Law from Gujarat University. He did a post-graduate certificate in Environment Impact Assessment from the University of Manchester. He has done a PhD in environmental engineering from Gujarat University. He was also a fellow at the Harvard Kennedy School. He was selected for Indian Administrative Service in 2010.

He began his career as a junior engineer in the Gujarat Pollution Control Board (GPCB). He is given credit for making Gujarat Pollution Control Board's operations modern and transparent.

In 2017, Shah was handpicked by PM Narendra Modi as Private Secretary to the Union minister of environment, forest and climate change and information and broadcasting.

In August 2019, Hardik Shah was appointed as deputy secretary in the Prime Minister's Office (India) (PMO). Shah was also behind the PM Modi's national plan to control the plastic menace and environment conservation. He has played an important role in bringing key policy changes nationally in controlling environmental pollution and promoting environmental protection in states.

He has closely worked with Nobel laureates Abhijit Banerjee, Esther Duflo, professor Michael Greenstone and environmental engineer John Briscoe.

Recognition 
He received the 'Special Recognition Award' as a Member Secretary, GPCB for e-Governance under 'Environment Category' by CSI Nihilent e-Governance Awards 2009–2010. In 2013, he was awarded the AMA's Outstanding Manager of the Year Award 2013 by the Ahmedabad Management Association.

References

External links 
 Dr. Hardik Shah's Bio

Indian Administrative Service officers
Prime Minister's Office (India)
Living people
People from Gujarat
Year of birth missing (living people)
 Gujarat University alumni